The 1966 Singapore Open, also known as the 1966 Singapore Open Badminton Championships, took place from 8 to 10 October 1966 at the Singapore Badminton Hall in Singapore.

Venue
Singapore Badminton Hall

Final results

References 

Singapore Open (badminton)
1966 in badminton